Dr. York Bailey House, also known as the Sara Rhodan House, is a historic home located on Saint Helena Island near Frogmore, Beaufort County, South Carolina. It was built about 1915, and is a two-story, vernacular frame American Foursquare style dwelling.  It was built for Dr. York W. Bailey (1881-1971), a prominent native of the island who was St. Helena's first African-American doctor and only resident physician for over 50 years.  He lived in this house until his death in 1971. The York W. Bailey Cultural Center and Museum at Penn Community Center is named for him.

The house was from a mail order catalogue.

It was listed in the National Register of Historic Places in 1988.

References

African-American history of South Carolina
Houses on the National Register of Historic Places in South Carolina
Houses completed in 1915
Houses in Beaufort County, South Carolina
National Register of Historic Places in Beaufort County, South Carolina